Amos Hakham (1921 – August 2, 2012) was the first winner of the International Bible Contest, who went on to become a Bible scholar and editor of the Da'at Miqra Bible commentary.

Biography 
Amos Hakham was born in Jerusalem in 1921 to Dr. Noah Hakham and Naomi  (née Shapiro). Hakham's father studied at the University of Vienna and the Jewish Theological Seminary, Vienna (graduated in 1912) and earned a doctorate. He moved to Jerusalem in 1913 and founded the Seminary for Teachers of the Mizrachi movement (now Lifshitz College of Education). He taught Bible there. Hakham's mother  was a pharmacist and a medic in Kvutzat Kinneret and in Kibbutz Degania. Amos was their only son.

Due to a fall in infancy, Hakham had speech difficulties. His father chose home schooling to help him avoid ridicule. His mother died when he was 15 years old. When he was 22, after his father died, he was hired as a clerk at the Institute for the Blind in Jerusalem in return for meals and pocket money. During his spare time he studied the Bible. He completed his bagrut matriculation exams at this time. In addition to his clerical duties, he tutored blind students studying at regular high schools in Jerusalem and helped to publish a Bible in Braille.

1958 National and International Bible Contest 
The turnaround in his life occurred in 1958 when it first International Bible Contest was announced. It was to be held on both a national and international level. Some of Amos' neighbors in Sha'arei Hesed, who knew of his erudition in the Bible, encouraged him to enter the contest.

Hakham was a star of the national contest, which was held at the International Convention Center in Jerusalem on August 4, 1958, and broadcast live on the radio. He was so poor he had to borrow a suit for the contest from a friend. The Prime Minister, David Ben-Gurion, who was an avid Bible enthusiast, attended the contest and at the end of it handed the prize to Hakham.

After Hakham won the national competition, he went on to win the international competition held in Jerusalem on August 19.

At the time, there was no TV in Israel and Kol Yisrael (Israel's public radio service) broadcast only on one radio channel. The International Bible Contest thus attracted a very wide audience across the country.  After his victory the Hebrew-language daily newspaper Davar crowned him as the "most popular man in Israel, even more than Hodorov". He was also chosen as the Person of the year of the newspaper "HaOlam HaZeh". Hakham, who had always been shy, suddenly became the center of national and international interest due to his vast knowledge and personal story.  After the contest, Prime Minister David Ben-Gurion invited him to his office. The Prime Minister accompanied him on a tour around the country and he was invited to teach Bible  at the Ayanot agricultural school.

When Hakham married a few years later, Ben-Gurion attended the ceremony. In 1963 his first son Noah was born. 

Hakham decided to study Bible in an orderly manner and earned an academic degree. Upon completing his studies he became a Bible scholar, publishing an eight volume commentary on the Bible known as Da'at Miqra, and wrote various articles for the Encyclopaedia Hebraica.  His writings are a synthesis of scholarship and faithfulness to Jewish tradition.

In his final years, he lived Efrat.He died on August 2, 2012, at the age of 91.

References

1921 births
2012 deaths
Israeli Jews
Israeli biblical scholars
Bible commentators
Jewish biblical scholars
20th-century Jewish biblical scholars